The 2002 If Stockholm Open was a men's tennis tournament played on indoor hard courts at the Kungliga tennishallen in Stockholm, Sweden and was part of the International Series of the 2002 ATP Tour. The tournament took place from 21 October through 27 October 2002. Paradorn Srichaphan won the singles title.

Finals

Singles

 Paradorn Srichaphan defeated  Marcelo Ríos 6–7(2–7), 6–0, 6–3, 6–2
 It was Srichaphan's 2nd title of the year and the 2nd of his career.

Doubles

 Wayne Black /  Kevin Ullyett defeated  Wayne Arthurs /  Paul Hanley 6–4, 2–6, 7–6(7–4)
 It was Black's 6th title of the year and the 13th of his career. It was Ullyett's 6th title of the year and the 19th of his career.

References

External links
 Official website 
 Official website 
 ATP tournament profile

 
If Stockholm Open
Stockholm Open
2002 in Swedish tennis
October 2002 sports events in Europe
2000s in Stockholm